Israeli currency may refer to these items:

Israeli new shekel, the current currency
Old Israeli shekel, used from 1980 to 1985
Israeli pound, used from 1948 to 1980
Shekel, used by the United Monarchy of Israel and the Kingdom of Israel, as well as during the Great Revolt

Currencies of Israel